The Union City Rams, originally known as the Brooklyn Buswicks were a minor league American football team that played from 1937 to 1939. They never had more than 2 wins in a season.

Brooklyn Bushwicks 
They were originally named the Brooklyn Bushwicks in 1937. They played in the Northern Division and had a 1-4-1 record. Their head coach was Paul Riblett.

Union City Rams

1938 Season 
In 1938 they moved and changed their name to the Union City Rams. The Rams had a 2-5-1 record. Their head coach was Bob Rosen.

1939 Season 
Their third and final season was in 1939. They were moved to the Southern Division and had a 2-5-2 record. They folded after the season.

References 

1937 establishments
1940 disestablishments